Something Special is the thirty-third solo studio album by American singer-songwriter Dolly Parton. It was released on August 22, 1995, by Columbia Records and Blue Eyes records. In addition to seven new Parton compositions, the album includes updated versions of three classics from Parton's repertoire: "Jolene", "The Seeker", and "I Will Always Love You", the latter of which was performed as a duet with Vince Gill. The Gill duet, Parton's third recording of the song, reached number 15 on the Billboard Hot Country Singles & Tracks chart, becoming Parton's highest charting single in four years. Additionally, it was named "Vocal Event of the Year" by the Country Music Association.

Release and promotion
The album was released on August 22, 1995, by Columbia Records and Blue Eye Records.

To promote the album Parton made several television appearances. She appeared on the Grand Ole Opry on August 26 and performed "Something Special", "Jolene", and "I Will Always Love You" with Vince Gill. Following this performance, radio stations began giving Parton and Gill's duet of "I Will Always Love You" unsolicited airplay, causing it to debut on the Billboard Hot Country Singles & Tracks chart. Parton appeared on The Tonight Show with Jay Leno on August 31 and performed "Something Special". She and Vince Gill performed "I Will Always Love You" on the 29th Annual Country Music Association Awards on October 4. Following their performance at the CMA Awards, the song was officially released as a single in November.

Critical reception

Upon its release, the album was met with mixed reviews from critics. A review from Billboard said that "it's a bit distressing when the highlights of a new Dolly Parton album are new recordings of old material."  The review went on to praise the re-recording of "I Will Always Love You" with Vince Gill, but felt that the "recent material pales here when contrasted with that duet and...older Parton compositions. The review concluded by saying, "The new stuff is good. The old stuff is great."

Stephen Thomas Erlewine of AllMusic gave the album three out of five stars, describing the album as "something of a mixed bag." Like the review from Billboard, Erlewine also felt that "the newer songs are fine, [but] they pale in comparison with [Parton's] classics." He went on to say that "if the new songs had been included on an album that only featured new material, they would have formed a strong record, but they take a back seat to Parton's older songs, which are more inspired and better-written." He concluded his review by saying that "the album provides several fine moments, even if it doesn't rank among her best works."

Track listing

Personnel

 Bob Bailey – background vocals 
 Eddie Bayers – drums
 Steve Buckingham – acoustic guitar
 Margie Cates – background vocals 
 Suzanne Cox – background vocals 
 Richard Dennison – background vocals 
 Stuart Duncan – fiddle
 Paul Franklin – steel guitar
 Steve Gibson – acoustic guitar 
 Vince Gill – duet vocals on "I Will Always Love You"
 Owen Hale – drums
 Vicki Hampton – background vocals 
 Yvonne Hodges – background vocals 
 Paul Hollowell – piano
 David Hungate – bass guitar
 Carl Jackson – background vocals 
 Alison Krauss – background vocals 
 Sonny Landreth – slide guitar
 Randy McCormick – organ
 Terry McMillan – percussion, shaker
 Brent Mason – acoustic guitar, electric guitar
 Jimmy Mattingly – fiddle
 Steve Nathan – piano
 Louis Dean Nunley – background vocals 
 Dale Oehler – conductor, string arrangements 
 Dolly Parton – lead vocals
 Don Potter – acoustic guitar 
 Chris Rodriguez – background vocals
 Matt Rollings – organ, piano
 Brent Rowan – electric guitar
 Steuart Smith – acoustic guitar 
 Duawne Starling – background vocals 
 Pam Tillis – background vocals 
 Steve Turner – drums
 Paul Uhrig – bass guitar 
 Reggie Young – electric guitar

Charts

Weekly charts

Year-end charts

References

1995 albums
Dolly Parton albums
Albums produced by Steve Buckingham (record producer)
Columbia Records albums